The 1950 Ohio Bobcats football team was an American football team that represented Ohio University in the Mid-American Conference (MAC) during the 1950 college football season. In their second season under head coach Carroll Widdoes, the Bobcats compiled a 6–4 record (2–2 against MAC opponents), finished in third place in the MAC, and outscored all opponents by a combined total of 165 to 161.  They played their home games in Peden Stadium in Athens, Ohio.

The team's statistical leaders included Quinn Stumpf with 609 rushing yards, Tom Anderson with 633 passing yards, and Nick Fogoros with 177 receiving yards.

Schedule

References

Ohio
Ohio Bobcats football seasons
Ohio Bobcats football